August is a 1996 British drama film directed by and starring Anthony Hopkins as Ieuan (IPA:j/əɨ/a/n) Davies, and featuring Rhys Ifans in a small role in one of his earliest films, as Griffiths. It is an adaptation of Anton Chekhov's 1899 play Uncle Vanya, with the character Ieuan Davies taking over the title role.

The film was Hopkins's first feature film with a full cast (he had previously directed the one-man-performance of Dylan Thomas: Return Journey in 1990). It would be over a decade before his next directorial effort, Slipstream in 2007, which he also wrote and for which he also composed the score.

During an interview on late night show, The Ghost of Hollywood, cinematographer, Robin Vidgeon, stated that working with Anthony Hopkins on August was the highlight of his career.

Cast
Anthony Hopkins as Ieuan Davies
Leslie Phillips as Prof. Alexander Blathwaite
Kate Burton as Helen Blathwaite
Gawn Grainger as Dr. Michael Lloyd
Rhian Morgan as Sian Blathwaite
Menna Trussler as Gwen
Rhoda Lewis as Mair Davies
Hugh Lloyd as Thomas Prosser
Huw Garmon as Dafydd Edwards
Rhys Ifans as Griffiths
Susan Ellen Flynn as Rhianon
Buddug Morgan as Nesta

Adaptation and issues
The film adapts Uncle Vanya to a turn-of-the-century Welsh setting, emphasizing the hardships of Welsh industrial life in the slate quarries and Welsh-English turmoil as an English professor upsets normal Welsh life when he arrives at the Welsh estate which acts as his vacation home (at one point Ieuan states that he feels that he has been cheated by the Prof. Blathwaite, just as "the English have always cheated the Welsh").

Language
It is primarily in English, with a few lines in Welsh here or there - such as diolch yn fawr iawn ("thank you very much"), cariad (a term of endearment, meaning "love"), and iechyd da ("cheers").

See also
 Meibion Glyndŵr, on Welsh-English relations surrounding the English taking vacation homes in Wales.
 List of Welsh films

References

External links 
 
 

1996 films
1990s English-language films
Films based on Uncle Vanya
Films directed by Anthony Hopkins
Films set in Wales
Cool Cymru
1996 drama films
The Samuel Goldwyn Company films
English-language Welsh films